Major-General Casimir Michael Grigg  (25 February 1917 – 30 January 2015) was a British Army officer who won the Military Cross in Sicily in 1943 and later was appointed the first major general of the Zambian Army by Kenneth Kaunda, having risen to the rank of major in the British Army.

References

External links 
http://www.kingsafricanriflesassociation.co.uk/departed-comrades/

1917 births
2015 deaths
Zambian generals
Recipients of the Military Cross
British Army personnel of World War II
Military personnel from London
Seaforth Highlanders officers
People educated at Eton College
Commanders of the Order of the British Empire